The Plaything of Broadway is a 1921 American drama film directed by John Francis Dillon and written by E. Lloyd Sheldon. The film stars Justine Johnstone, Crauford Kent, Macey Harlam, Edwards Davis, George Cowl, and Lucy Parker. The film was released in February 1921, by Realart Pictures Corporation.

Cast   
Justine Johnstone as Lola
Crauford Kent as Dr. Jennings
Macey Harlam as Pell
Edwards Davis as Whitney
George Cowl as Dr. Dexter
Lucy Parker as Mrs. O'Connor
Claude Cooper as The Patriarch
Garry McGarry as Dr. Hastings
Gertrude Hillman as Mrs. Ford
Mrs. Charles Willard as Mrs. Slattery

References

External links

 

1921 films
1920s English-language films
Silent American drama films
1921 drama films
Films directed by John Francis Dillon
American silent feature films
American black-and-white films
1920s American films